Troubadour Theater Company is a theater company in Los Angeles.

They play at the Falcon Theatre, and Richard and Karen Carpenter Performing Arts Center, Long Beach, and give readings at the Getty Museum.

In 2009, they played Oedipus the King, Mama!, and Chekhov’s The Seagull.

Awards and nominations

References

External links

Theatre companies in Los Angeles
Theatre in Los Angeles
Regional theatre in the United States